Jim Hill (born February 26, 1950) is an American politician. He is a member of the Alabama House of Representatives from the 50th District, serving since 2014. He is a member of the Republican party.

References

Living people
Republican Party members of the Alabama House of Representatives
1950 births
People from Starkville, Mississippi
21st-century American politicians